Earls is a rural unincorporated community in Amelia County in the U.S. state of Virginia.

The immediate vicinity of Earls appears to have been spared significant action during most of the Civil War. Troops from both sides would have passed through during the final days of the war in early April 1865, as Confederate forces retreated westward and Union forces pursued. However, most of the movement around Earls appears to have occurred during a brief lull in the fighting, between the Battle of Namozine Church and a series of engagements in western Amelia County. General Robert E. Lee surrendered to Ulysses S. Grant at Appomattox on April 9.

Manassas Hill School, built sometime between 1917 and 1920, was among the first of several Rosenwald Schools in Amelia County. It was designed for one teacher and located on modern-day SR 615 (Namozine Road) near Earls. During the early 20th century, the Rosenwald School project was a collaborative effort that constructed thousands of facilities across the South primarily for the education of African American children. The Manassas Hill School property was advertised for sale in the 1960s, after desegregation.

Manassa (also spelled "Manaza") Hill Baptist, a historic African American church, is located 2 miles north of Earls on Route 615.

References

Unincorporated communities in Virginia
Unincorporated communities in Amelia County, Virginia